St Anne Within the Liberty of Westminster, also known as St Anne Soho, was a civil parish in the metropolitan area of London, England. The creation of the parish accompanied the building of St Anne's Church, Soho to meet the demands of the growing population. The parish was formed in 1687 from part of the ancient parish of St Martin in the Fields in the Liberty of Westminster and county of Middlesex. It included the eastern section of the contemporary districts of Soho to the north of Shaftesbury Avenue and Chinatown to the south of it. Initially controlled by a select vestry, the parish was governed by an open vestry of all inhabitants until 1855, when the vestry was superseded for most purposes by the Strand District Board of Works. In 1889 the parish became part of the County of London and in 1900 the local authority became Westminster City Council. The parish continued to have nominal existence until 1922.

Creation
It was created in 1687 from part of the ancient parish of St Martin in the Fields, and was within the Liberty of Westminster. The parish was included in the returns of the Bills of mortality. The creation of the new parish followed the building of the St Anne's Church, Soho and required an act of parliament, which received royal assent on 15 July 1678. A further act of parliament was required to finance and build the church, and a commission of local inhabitants was created for this purpose. The church was completed and the commission became the select vestry of the parish. However, the select vestry was not constituted in the 1678 act creating the parish and was challenged. By 21 May 1744 the parish was governed by an open vestry of all parishioners.

Government

The parish vestry of St Anne's had responsibility for the church, poor relief, and certain civil functions. These included street paving, sanitation, lighting the streets, watching, and the prevention of fire. In common with other parishes, these functions were absorbed by ad hoc authorities as local government was reformed.

Reform
It was grouped into the Strand District in 1855 when it came within the area of responsibility of the Metropolitan Board of Works. It was an exclave of the district, with the main part located to the southeast and adjacent to the River Thames. The parish elected twenty-four vestrymen to the Strand District Board of Works.

In 1889 the parish became part of the County of London and in 1900 it became part of the Metropolitan Borough of Westminster. It was abolished as a civil parish in 1922.

Geography

The northern boundary was Oxford Street, the western boundary was Berwick Street/Rupert Street, to the south was an irregular boundary around Leicester Square, and the eastern boundary was to the west of Charing Cross Road north of Cambridge Circus and to the east of it to the south. In modern terms it corresponded to the eastern section of Soho including Chinatown.

Poor law
After the introduction of the New Poor Law, the parish was part of the Strand poor law union from 1836 to 1868. It formed part of the Westminster union from 1868 to 1913 and the City of Westminster union from 1913. When the parish of St Anne was abolished in 1922 it was merged with other parishes to form the City of Westminster parish for poor law purposes.

Population
The population at each census was:

References

History of local government in London (pre-1855)
History of the City of Westminster
Parishes united into districts (Metropolis)
Former civil parishes in London
Bills of mortality parishes